Juan Manuel Álvarez may refer to:

 Juan Manuel Álvarez (born 1979), American convicted of causing the 2005 Glendale train crash
 Juan Álvarez (footballer, born 1948), played for the Mexico national football team
 Juan Álvarez (footballer, born July 1996), currently playing for C.F. Monterrey